Your Mom's Favorite DJ is the third studio album by Canadian turntablist Kid Koala, released on Ninja Tune in 2006. The album features three rock-influenced “Slew Test” tracks that were later included in different, extended form on 100%, the 2009 debut release from Kid Koala’s collaborative band project The Slew.

Critical reception
Marisa Brown of AllMusic gave the album 4 stars out of 5, saying, "as a fun, informative celebration of Koala's decade of work, it's absolutely great." Brian Hull of Okayplayer said, "Your Mom's Favorite DJ is laden with blues, fuzzed out guitars, Dixieland, and more sampled dialogue than most records can boast in lyrics."

David Downs of East Bay Express listed it on his "Best Records of 2006" list.

Track listing

Personnel
Credits adapted from liner notes.

 Kid Koala – production, turntables, drawing, character
 The Slew – production
 Vid Cousins – mixing
 Sarah Register – mastering
 Sekondhandprojects.com – layout
 Pat Hamou – layout
 Paul Labonté – text, photography
 Louisa Schabas – set, shading
 Ryhna Thompson – management

References

External links
 

2006 albums
Kid Koala albums
Ninja Tune albums